János Zováth (born 25 February 1977 in Gödöllő) is a Hungarian football player who currently plays for Mezőkövesd-Zsóry SE.

FIFA Youth World Cup 
In 1997, János Zováth was a member of the Hungarian under-20 team which participated in 1997 FIFA world cup in Malaysia. During the tournament, he played in 2 matches against Argentina (0–3) and Australia (0–1). However, he missed the last game against Canada (1–2) due to suspension.

Honours 
Hungarian League:
Winner: 2004
Runner-up: 2005
Hungarian Cup:
Winner: 2004
Runner-up: 2005, 2006

References 
EUFO
HLSZ
FIFA

1977 births
Living people
People from Gödöllő
Hungarian footballers
Hungary youth international footballers
Hungarian expatriate footballers
Vasas SC players
Ferencvárosi TC footballers
Paksi FC players
AEP Paphos FC players
Nemzeti Bajnokság I players
Cypriot First Division players
Expatriate footballers in Cyprus
Association football midfielders
Budapesti VSC footballers
Hungarian expatriate sportspeople in Cyprus
Mezőkövesdi SE footballers
Szolnoki MÁV FC footballers
Sportspeople from Pest County